Stephan van der Walt (born 21 April 1991 in Klerksdorp, South Africa) is a rugby union player who plays as either an outside-centre or winger for Japanese Top East League side Tokyo Gas.

In October 2012, Van der Walt was named in the  Extended Playing Squad for the 2013 Super Rugby season.

References

Rugby union centres
1991 births
Living people
Afrikaner people
South African people of Dutch descent
ACT Brumbies players
South African emigrants to Australia
Rugby union players from North West (South African province)